Brock McGinn (born February 2, 1994) is a Canadian professional ice hockey left winger for the  Anaheim Ducks of the National Hockey League (NHL). He was drafted 47th overall by the Carolina Hurricanes in the 2012 NHL Entry Draft.

Playing career
McGinn played four seasons of junior hockey for the Guelph Storm of the Ontario Hockey League (OHL) from 2010-11 through 2013-14. During the 2012 NHL Entry Draft, he was selected in the second round, 47th overall by the Carolina Hurricanes.

On April 3, 2013, the Hurricanes signed McGinn to a three-year, entry-level contract. He joined the Hurricanes' American Hockey League (AHL) affiliate, the Charlotte Checkers, to close out the 2012-13 AHL season. Having returned to the Storm for the 2013–14 season, McGinn established a junior career high numbers in which he tallied 43 goals and 85 points.

In his first full professional season in 2014–15, McGinn recorded 15 goals and 27 points in 73 games for the Checkers. After scoring two goals in two games to start the 2015–16 season with the Checkers, McGinn received his first NHL recall and made his debut on October 16, 2015 against the Detroit Red Wings. In his first shift, McGinn scored his first NHL goal to open the scoring after only 55 seconds. It was the fastest debut goal since Alexander Mogilny scored after 20 seconds in 1989. He also contributed with an assist to help the Hurricanes defeat the Red Wings 5-3.

McGinn became a regular for the Hurricanes during the 2016-17 season, skating in 57 games.

In Game 7 of the 2019 Eastern Conference First Round against the Washington Capitals, McGinn made a save with just over two minutes remaining in regulation, and scored the series-winning goal with 8:55 left in double overtime on an assist by Justin Williams.

On July 20, 2019, the Hurricanes re-signed McGinn to a two-year, $4.2 million contract extension.

Upon reaching unrestricted free agency after the  season, McGinn joined the Pittsburgh Penguins on July 28, 2021 by signing a four-year, $11 million contract. 

On March 3, 2023, the Penguins traded McGinn and a third-round draft pick to the Anaheim Ducks in exchange for Dmitry Kulikov.

Personal life
McGinn has two brothers who also play professional hockey, with Brock being the youngest. Jamie (born 1988) was a 2006 second-round pick by the San Jose Sharks who most recently played for the Florida Panthers. Tye (born 1990) was a 2010 fourth-round pick by the Philadelphia Flyers and who most recently played for the Chicago Wolves of the American Hockey League.

Along with his father, Bob McGinn, and his two brothers, he is one of the owners of the Roanoke Rail Yard Dawgs of the Southern Professional Hockey League.

Career statistics

References

External links

1994 births
Living people
Anaheim Ducks players
Canadian ice hockey left wingers
Canadian people of Irish descent
Carolina Hurricanes draft picks
Carolina Hurricanes players
Charlotte Checkers (2010–) players
Guelph Storm players
Pittsburgh Penguins players
Ice hockey people from Ontario